Cloyd Victor Boyer Jr. (September 1, 1927 – September 20, 2021) was an American right-handed pitcher and pitching coach in Major League Baseball who played between 1949 and 1955 for the St. Louis Cardinals (1949–52) and Kansas City Athletics (1955). His brothers Ken and Clete were also professional baseball players.

Biography
Boyer was born in Alba, Missouri. He was the eldest son in a family that included third basemen Ken Boyer and Clete Boyer. Ken, 1964 National League Most Valuable Player, an 11-time Major League Baseball All-Star and five-time Gold Glove Award winner, had a 15-year big-league career with the Cardinals, New York Mets, Chicago White Sox and Los Angeles Dodgers; Clete won only one Gold Glove because of the presence of Brooks Robinson, but played all or parts of 16 MLB seasons for the Athletics, New York Yankees and Atlanta Braves.

In a five-season career, Cloyd Boyer posted a 20–23 record with 198 strikeouts and a 4.73 earned run average in 395⅔ innings pitched, including 13 complete games, three shutouts, and two saves. Boyer also played for the Duluth Dukes, a Cardinals minor league team, in 1947. During the 1947 season in Duluth, Boyer compiled a record of 16 wins against 9 losses. He struck out 239 and took the strikeout lead in the Northern League. After that season, he was sold to the Houston Buffs, for whom he played in 1948.

After his playing career finished, Boyer became a scout, minor league pitching instructor and major league pitching coach—spending much of his time in the New York Yankees' organization. He was also the pitching coach during Bobby Cox's first term as manager of the Atlanta Braves. Boyer is credited with helping Fritz Peterson become a star pitcher.

Boyer died in Carthage, Missouri, on September 20, 2021. At the time, he was the 18th oldest former Major League Baseball player at 94 years, 19 days old.

References

External links

1927 births
2021 deaths
Atlanta Braves coaches
Baseball coaches from Missouri
Baseball players from Missouri
Binghamton Triplets managers
Carthage Cardinals players
Columbus Red Birds players
Duluth Dukes players
Fort Lauderdale Yankees managers
Houston Buffaloes players
Indianapolis Indians players
Johnson City Cardinals players
Kansas City Athletics players
Kansas City Royals coaches
Lynchburg Cardinals players
Major League Baseball pitchers
Major League Baseball pitching coaches
Minor league baseball coaches
New York Yankees coaches
New York Yankees scouts
People from Jasper County, Missouri
Rochester Red Wings players
Sacramento Solons players
St. Louis Cardinals players